Bala Zarrin Kola (also Romanized as Bālā Zarrīn Kolā; also known as Zarrīn Kolā-ye Bālā) is a village in Larim Rural District, Gil Khuran District, Juybar County, Mazandaran Province, Iran. At the 2006 census, its population was 655, in 173 families.

References 

Populated places in Juybar County